Gulud is an ethnic group in the Nuba Hills in Sudan. They speak Katla, a Kordofanian language. The number of persons in this group is about 10,000.

References
Joshua Project

Nuba peoples
Ethnic groups in Sudan